Lawrence Francis Stengel (born August 7, 1952) is a former United States district judge of the United States District Court for the Eastern District of Pennsylvania.

Education and career 

Born in Lancaster, Pennsylvania, Stengel is the son of Lawrence E. Stengel (d. 2006), a lawyer. He received a Bachelor of Arts degree from Saint Joseph's University in 1974 and a Juris Doctor from the University of Pittsburgh School of Law in 1980. He was a teacher at Lancaster Catholic High School from 1974 to 1977. He was in private practice in Pittsburgh from 1980 to 1984, and in Lancaster from 1985 to 1990. He was a judge on the Lancaster County Court of Common Pleas from 1990 to 2004. He also teaches as an adjunct professor at Franklin & Marshall College from 1997 to present, and at Millersville University from 2000 to 2004.

Notable case

As a state judge, Stengel presided over the trial of Lisa Michelle Lambert for the murder of Laurie Show, a noteworthy case in Lancaster County history.

Federal judicial service 

On November 6, 2003, Stengel was nominated by President George W. Bush to a seat on the United States District Court for the Eastern District of Pennsylvania vacated by Ronald L. Buckwalter. Stengel was confirmed by the United States Senate on June 16, 2004, and received his commission on June 21, 2004. Stengel became Chief Judge of the District on August 1, 2017, and resigned from that position on August 1, 2018. Stengel retired from active service on August 31, 2018, and joined the Saxton and Stump law firm to lead their investigations and mediation group, Optimal Dispute Resolutions.

Personal life
Stengel has been married twice. He has five children. He lives in East Hempfield Township, Pennsylvania; as a federal judge, he commuted to work at the James A. Byrne United States Courthouse in Philadelphia.

References

External links 
 

1952 births
Living people
20th-century American lawyers
20th-century American judges
21st-century American lawyers
21st-century American judges
Franklin & Marshall College faculty
Judges of the Pennsylvania Courts of Common Pleas
Judges of the United States District Court for the Eastern District of Pennsylvania
Pennsylvania lawyers
People from Lancaster, Pennsylvania
Saint Joseph's University alumni
United States district court judges appointed by George W. Bush
University of Pittsburgh School of Law alumni